Stępniak, Stempniak, Stepniak  or Stepnyak is a Polish surname. It may refer to:

Grzegorz Stępniak (born 1989), Polish cyclist
Jakub Stępniak (born 1991), Polish singer known as Kuba Ka
Lee Stempniak (born 1983), American ice hockey player
Sergey Stepnyak-Kravchinsky (1851–1895), Russian anarchist

Polish-language surnames
Ukrainian-language surnames